The London Correctional Institution (LoCI) is located in Union Township, Madison County, just west of London, Ohio,  southwest of Columbus. It was originally known as the London Prison Farm. From 1913 to 1925 it was a branch of the Ohio Penitentiary in Columbus. In 1925, it became a separate facility. The prison currently accommodates approximately: 2,500 adult males in three security levels: minimum, medium and close-security.

Construction and Ohio State inmates 
When the London Prison Farm was first proposed, there were two possible locations, Plain City and London. The decision was made to build the prison in London and the land, most of which was swamp, was purchased from John Ellsworth. In 1910, honor inmates were transported from the Ohio Penitentiary to London by railway to construct the prison.

Facilities for the inmates 
Originally, prisoners were housed in dormitories, each of which held around 300 men. There were isolation cells in case an inmate had to be punished. By March 1928, the prison housed 507 inmates. All the inmates were examined at the Ohio Penitentiary and if the men didn't have any diseases, they were shipped to the Farm. The London Prison Farm had different types of vocational training, but no educational program for the inmates. Today, London is one of the least costly institutions in Ohio's DR&C to operate.

Present day 
Over $30 million have been spent to renovate the prison. As of November 2013, the population was 2,283 inmates. The prison has a staff of 379 employees.

Programs for the inmates 
The London Correctional Institution provides programs for the inmates, such as the Family Life Centers and The New Beginnings Unit. Now, the facility has a reading room for inmates and their children. Inmates are also able to earn their GEDs and other academic diplomas. Vocational programs include auto technology, barbering, dental lab, HVAC (heating, ventilation, and air-conditioning), web based design, animal training, and culinary arts.

References 

Prisons in Ohio
Buildings and structures in Madison County, Ohio
London, Ohio
1924 establishments in Ohio